Turlough may refer to:

Places 
 Turlough (lake), a transient waterbody, common in Ireland, fed by groundwater
 Turlough, County Mayo, Ireland, a village
 Turlough Hill, a mountain in Ireland
 Turloughmore County Galway

People 
 Toirdelbach, a masculine Irish given name sometimes Anglicised as Turlough
 Turlough O'Brien, Gaelic football manager
 Toirdelbach Ua Briain (1009–1086) Anglicised as Turlough O'Brien, King of Munster, effectively High King of Ireland
 Turlough Luineach O'Neill (1530–1595) Ulster chieftain
 Turlough MacShane O'Neill (died 1608), Irish landowner
 Turlough Ó Carolan (1670–1738) Irish harper
 Vislor Turlough, fictional character from Doctor Who